John Sandblom (July 5, 1871 – July 24, 1948) was a Swedish sailor who competed in the 1928 Summer Olympics.

In 1928 he was a crew member of the Swedish boat Sylvia which won the bronze medal in the 8 metre class.

External links
profile

1871 births
1948 deaths
Swedish male sailors (sport)
Olympic sailors of Sweden
Sailors at the 1928 Summer Olympics – 8 Metre
Olympic bronze medalists for Sweden
Olympic medalists in sailing

Medalists at the 1928 Summer Olympics